Brama myersi is a species of Perciformes in the family Bramidae.

References 

myersi
Animals described in 1972